The 2009–10 Mid-American Conference season is the 64th season in Mid-American Conference (MAC) existence. Teams in this conference complete in the National Collegiate Athletic Association's Division I competitions.  In this season, the Mid-American Conference (MAC) sponsored 23 sports (11 men's and 12 women's).

Member schools
The MAC has both full members and affiliate members.  Full members participate in Mid-American Conference for all of their Division I athletics, unless the conference doesn't sponsor the sport.

Full membership
12 teams enjoyed full membership in the Mid-American Conference for the 2009–10 season.  The teams are divided geographically into East and West Divisions.

Affiliate membership
Along with the 12 full members, there are five other schools who hold an Affiliate Membership with the Mid-American Conference.  Affiliate Membership allows the team to participate in one sport within the conference.

Awards

Reese Trophy
The Reese Trophy is named after the first Mid-American Conference Commissioner David Reese.  Reese was the first commissioner of the conference from 1946 until 1964.  Only full members of the Mid-American Conference are eligible for the Reese and Jacoby Trophies.  Schools receive points based on their final finish in ten of the 11 men's sports.  Schools must choose to count either indoor track and field or outdoor track and field.  Both cannot be used in the calculation.  The winner is determined by the highest average score.

* Affiliate status only. Does not qualify for trophy.

Legend – BB: Baseball; MBB: Men's basketball; XC: Men's cross country; FB: Football; MSC: Men's soccer; MSW: Men's swimming; MT: Men's tennis; ITF: Indoor track and field; OTF: Outdoor track and field; WR: Wrestling

Jacoby Trophy
The Jacoby Trophy is awarded to the best women's athletic program in the conference.  It is named after Fred Jacoby, commissioner from 1971 until 1982, who incorporated women's athletics into the league's structure.  Along with the Reese trophy, only full members are eligible and schools may only count Indoor or Outdoor Track and field.

* Affiliate status only. Does not qualify for trophy.

Legend – WBB: Women's Basketball; WXC: Women's Cross country; FH: Field hockey; Gym: Gymnastics; SB: Softball; WSC: Women's Soccer; WSW: Women's Swimming; WT: Women's Tennis; ITF: Indoor track and field; OTF: Outdoor Track and field; VB: Volleyball

Player of the Week
The conference announces a Player of the Week in all of their sports.  In most of them, there is only one player announced.  However, in some situations (particularly in football), there will be multiple players announced.  The award is given to those that show exceptional talent on and off the field for that week.

Sports

Baseball

Basketball

Men's

Women's

Cross country
On August 25, the Mid-American Conference announced the preseason favorites for the 2009 Cross Country season.  On the men's side, Kent State returns five athletes from the 2008 MAC Championship third place squad.  After them is Miami, who is also tapped to repeat as the women's MAC Champions.  The rest of the teams are listed below:

The season began on August 31, when Ball State competed in the Ball State Invitational.  The Mid-American Conference Championship will be held in Athens, Ohio on October 31, with the NCAA Great Lakes Regional Championship held on November 14 at Indiana University and the National Championships held on November 23 at Indiana State University.

Championships
The following are the results of the 2009 Men's Cross Country Championships:

1. Kent State, 30 points
2. Eastern Michigan, 55
3. Central Michigan, 59
4. Miami, 95
5. Buffalo, 147
6. Ohio, 182
7. Toledo, 184
8. Akron, 197
9. Bowling Green, 283

The following are the results of the 2009 Women's Cross Country Championships:

1. Miami, 44 points
2. Toledo, 63
3. Akron, 104
4. Central Michigan, 116
5. Kent State, 143
6. Eastern Michigan, 157
7. Bowling Green, 212
8. NIU, 218
8. Ohio, 218
10. Western Michigan, 250
11. Ball State, 269
12. Buffalo, 317

Field hockey
Along with the Men's Cross Country Championship, the Kent State field hockey team was selected during the preseason to win the MAC Championship, in a vote by the league's head coaches.  Kent State lived up to that expectation in their first game, winning by a score of 7-0 against Saint Louis.  Miami was selected to finish second, after returning nine letterwinners from the 2008 season.  Following them are Ohio, Central Michigan, Ball State, and affiliate member Missouri State.

Football

The football season began on September 3 as three MAC teams played out-of-conference matches.

In previous seasons, the winner of the Mid-American Conference Championship Game would play in the Motor City Bowl.  However, due to financial troubles in sponsors such as General Motors and Ford, the game began to be sponsored by Little Caesars.  The 2009 Little Caesars Pizza Bowl will be held on December 26 at 1:00 p.m.

The preseason rankings by MAC coaches have Central Michigan winning the MAC West and Buffalo winning the MAC East, with Central Michigan winning the MAC Championship game.

Golf

Gymnastics
MAC Championship results:
 Central Michigan, 195.600 points
 Kent State, 195.025
 Eastern Michigan, 193.625
 NIU, 193.200
 Ball State, 193.100
 Western Michigan, 192.875
 Bowling Green, 191.850

Soccer

Men's
The 2009 Men's soccer season began on September 1 when Bowling Green faced Marshall and came victorious with a 2-0 win.  The Akron Zips were unanimously selected as the preseason league and tournament favorite, which was followed by their #3 preseason ranking in the NSCAA polls.  The Zips were also ranked second in the country according to Soccer America.

Women's
On the women's side, Toledo was selected as the preseason favorite for both the regular season and the tournament.  Their season began on August 21 when Kent State defeated Eastern Kentucky by a margin of 2-1.

Softball

Swimming

Men's MAC Championship
 Eastern Michigan, 773 points
 Buffalo, 
 Missouri State, 587
 Miami, 
 Southern Illinois, 478
 Ball State, 
 Evansville,

Women's MAC Championship
1. Toledo,  points
2. Miami, 572
3. Ohio, 527
4. Eastern Michigan, 
5. Akron, 392
5. Buffalo, 392
7. Bowling Green, 241
8. Ball State, 166

Tennis

Track and field

Men's indoor
 Eastern Michigan, 171 points
 Akron, 120
 Kent, 113
 Buffalo, 72
 Central Michigan, 49

Women's indoor
 Kent State, 107 points
 Central Michigan, 100
 Western Michigan, 92
 Miami, 
 Eastern Michigan, 75
 Akron, 61
 Buffalo, 46
 Toledo, 44
 Ohio, 
 Ball State, 25
 Bowling Green, 6
 NIU, 1

Volleyball
For the second consecutive year, Western Michigan was tabbed as the preseason favorite in the regular season as well as the MAC 2008 tournament.  Soon thereafter, they followed up by receiving votes in the American Volleyball Coaches Association preseason poll.  The 2009 MAC Championship will be held in Toledo, Ohio from November 17 through November 22.

Wrestling
 Central Michigan, 94 points
 Kent State, 73
 Ohio, 62
 Buffalo, 
 NIU, 
 Eastern Michigan, 18

References

Mid-American Conference seasons